Zygmund Sazevich (May 2, 1899 Kovno, Russia (now Kaunas, Lithuania) – 1968 San Francisco) was an American sculptor.

He studied at the University of Kazan.
He immigrated to the San Francisco area in 1923.  
He studied art at University of California, Berkeley and the California School of Fine Arts.
He taught at the California School of Fine Arts from 1947 to 1965, and at Mills College from 1947 to 1958.

He created sculpture for Post Offices in Roseville, California, San Mateo, California, and carved three wood bas reliefs for the post office in Kent, Washington.
His bronze sculpture, Egrets, is at Los Altos, California.

References

External links
"Oral history interview with Zygmund Sazevich, 1965 Jan. 22", Archives of American Art
http://www.newdealartregistry.org/artist/Sazevichzygmund/
http://www.historicaldesign.com/index.php?page=zygmund-sazevich-1925

1899 births
1968 deaths
Artists from Kaunas
University of California, Berkeley alumni
San Francisco Art Institute alumni
San Francisco Art Institute faculty
Mills College faculty
Artists from the San Francisco Bay Area
Soviet emigrants to the United States
Treasury Relief Art Project artists